Kel Ahaggar (Berber: ⴾⵍ ⵂⴴⵔ) (trans: "People of Ahaggar") is a Tuareg confederation inhabiting the Hoggar Mountains (Ahaggar mountains) in Algeria. The confederation is believed to have been founded by the Tuareg matriarch Tin Hinan, whose monumental tomb is located at Abalessa. The official establishment is dated to around 1750. It has been largely defunct since 1977, when it was terminated by the Algerian government.

The language of the confederation is Tahaggart, a dialect of Tamahaq.

Tribes 
The Kel Ahaggar confederation is made up of a number of tribes, including:
Aït Loaien
Dag Rali (also spelled Dag Ghâli)
Iregenaten
Kel Rela, the ruling tribe.
Kel Silet
Taituq
Tégéhé Millet

Popular culture 
A novel about the 1881 attempt by the French government to drive a railroad through the heart of the Sahara, including the Ahaggar region.  The expedition, led by Lt. Colonel Paul Flatters, was attacked by the Tuareg of the Kel Ahaggar.
The 1957 film Legend of the Lost, starring John Wayne, Rossano Brazzi and Sophie Loren, has the trio on a treasure hunt in the Sahara. They come across a nomadic group which Wayne’s character, Joe January, states are “Hoggars”, and to be much feared.

See also 
Rulers of Kel Ahaggar
Tuareg people
Kel Adagh
Kel Ajjer
Kel Ayr
Kel Gres
Iwellemmedan people: Kel Ataram (west) and Kel Dinnik (east)

References

External links 
 https://web.archive.org/web/20070930191707/http://sea.unep-wcmc.org/sites/pa/1460v.htm
 Kel Ahaggar (in German)
 https://web.archive.org/web/20050922005745/http://www.petrabode.privat.t-online.de/detail.htm (in German)

1977 disestablishments in Algeria
States and territories established in 1750
States and territories disestablished in 1977
African nomads
Berber history
Maghreb
Sahara
Society of Algeria
Tuareg confederations